McKenry is a surname. Notable people with the surname include:

Limb McKenry (1888–1956), American baseball player
Michael McKenry (born 1985), American baseball player

See also
McHenry (name)